The Admiral-class battlecruisers were to have been a class of four British Royal Navy battlecruisers built near the end of World War I. Their design began as an improved version of the s, but it was recast as a battlecruiser after Admiral John Jellicoe, commander of the Grand Fleet, pointed out that there was no real need for more battleships, but that a number of German battlecruisers had been laid down that were superior to the bulk of the Grand Fleet's battlecruisers and the design was revised to counter these. Their designs were updated to incorporate the lessons from the Battle of Jutland, but the Admiralty eventually decided that it was better to begin again with a clean-slate design so they were cancelled in 1919. No more battlecruisers would be built due to the arms limitations agreements of the interbellum.

Hood, however, was sufficiently advanced in construction that she was completed in 1920 and immediately became flagship of the Battlecruiser Squadron of the Atlantic Fleet. She served as the flagship of the Special Service Squadron during its round-the-world cruise in 1923–1924. Hood was transferred to the Mediterranean Fleet in 1936 and spent much of the next few years on Non-Intervention Patrols during the Spanish Civil War, returning to the United Kingdom before the beginning of World War II and the Battlecruiser Squadron of the Home Fleet.

Hood spent most of the early part of the war patrolling against German commerce raiders and escorting convoys. Flagship of Force H, based at Gibraltar, she bombarded French ships during the attack on Mers-el-Kébir. In the subsequent Battle of the Denmark Strait, the aft magazines of Hood exploded, sinking her within five minutes of opening fire.

Design and description
In 1915 the Admiralty was considering the next generation of warship to follow the Queen Elizabeth-class battleships. The Director of Naval Construction (DNC), Sir Eustace Tennyson-d'Eyncourt, was given instructions to prepare designs for a new battleship. The design should: "take the armament, armour and engine power of Queen Elizabeth as the standard and build around them a hull which should draw as little water as was considered practicable and safe, and which should embody all the latest protection and improvements against underwater attack." The design ('A') was submitted to the Admiralty on 30 November for consideration. Large anti-torpedo bulges were fitted, and the secondary armament of twelve  guns of a new design was mounted on the forecastle deck. The resulting high freeboard gave the design a greater ratio of reserve buoyancy to displacement than in any previous British dreadnought. The First Sea Lord, Admiral Sir Henry Jackson, responded on 6 December that such a large ship might start a new arms race with the Americans that Britain could ill afford, and that better deck protection was necessary to defeat plunging shells during long-range engagements.

The first of the two ('C1') was to have full bulge protection and the second ('C2') to have the best bulge protection possible without exceeding Queen Elizabeths length. In both proposals it had been necessary to reduce the number of guns in the secondary armament and reduce the thickness of the armour. The Admiralty was not pleased with either design and asked for a revised version of 'A' of the same draught, beam, armour and armament, but shortened and with the same speed as Queen Elizabeth. In addition the new five-inch gun was rejected in favour of the existing  gun.

At least some of the designs were passed to Admiral John Jellicoe, commander of the Grand Fleet, who pointed out that there was no need for new battleships as the British superiority in numbers over the Germans was substantial, but that was not true for battlecruisers. Germany was known to be building three new s with an estimated speed approaching  and a reported armament of  guns. These ships would be superior to all existing British battlecruisers, and those then under construction (the two  and the three  'large light cruisers') were equally fast, but too thinly armoured to compete with them. He also remarked that his experience with Queen Elizabeth-class had persuaded him that an intermediate speed between the battleships and the battlecruisers was of little use; he suggested that the design should be for either a  battleship or a 30-knot battlecruiser, preferably the latter.

The DNC prepared two new designs in response to Admiral Jellicoe's comments on 1 February 1916, each for a battlecruiser capable of thirty knots or better and armed with eight  guns. Design '1' displaced  with two inches less belt armour and a speed of thirty knots. It used the bulky large-tube boilers traditional in British capital ships, which explains why the design was  larger than any of the previous battleship designs. Design '2' was essentially a repeat of the first design except that small-tube boilers were substituted. These were considerably smaller than the older type and saved  over Design '1' and had one foot less draught. These savings were substantial enough to overcome the Engineer-in-Chief's objections that they required more frequent and expensive repairs. The DNC was asked to submit four more designs using small-tube boilers which were submitted on 17 February. Design '3' was selected as Admiral Jellicoe had specified that the minimum number of guns should be no less than eight as fewer caused problems in accurate fire control, and two alternatives were to be provided, one with a dozen 5.5-inch guns and the other with sixteen such guns. The latter proposal was selected on 7 April and orders were placed on 19 April for three ships (Hood, Howe and Rodney). The order for the fourth ship, Anson, was placed on 13 June.

 was laid down on 31 May 1916, the same day as the Battle of Jutland. The loss of three British battlecruisers during that battle caused the work on all three ships to be suspended pending an investigation into possible design flaws. Admiral Jellicoe's investigation blamed the loss of the ships on faulty cordite handling procedures that allowed fires in the turrets or hoists to reach the ships' magazines. It recommended anti-flash equipment be installed in magazines and handling rooms and the improvement of deck armour over the magazines to prevent plunging shells or fragments from reaching the magazines. The DNC and the Third Sea Lord opposed the latter, believing that there was no direct evidence that the magazines had been directly penetrated.

On 5 July the DNC submitted two revised designs for the Admiral-class ships. The first was a modification of the previous design with slight increases to the deck, turret, barbette, and funnel uptake armour, one-inch protection for the 5.5-inch ammunition hatches and hoists, and the number of electrical generators increased from four to eight. The second design drastically improved the protection and converted the ships into fast battleships. The vertical armour was generally increased by 50% and the deck protection was slightly thickened as in the first design. This design would have been equal to the Queen Elizabeths, but  faster and with much improved torpedo protection, although it was some  larger than the older ships. After the DNC submitted the above designs, he was asked to consider variations with triple fifteen-inch turrets, and these were submitted on 20 July. The Admiralty chose the fast battleship design, and Hood was laid down again on 1 September.

Later that month Hoods armour scheme was slightly revised in light of further analysis of the results of Jutland and the deck armour was modestly increased in order to ensure that a minimum thickness of nine inches of armour would have to be penetrated by shells striking at angles of descent up to 30° from the horizontal. Further alterations were made in 1917 during her construction that increased the thickness of her turret faces and roofs. The changes continued during 1918 when the thickness of her magazine crowns was increased from one inch to two; the armour for the funnel uptakes above the forecastle deck was omitted in compensation. In May 1919 her main deck armour at the side abreast the magazines was increased to three inches (76 mm), and four 5.5-inch guns and their ammunition were deleted in consequence. However, the additional deck armour was never fitted and the torpedo tubes (less their protection) were retained.

Earlier in 1917, however, construction of Hoods three sisters had been suspended as the amount of labour and material they required would be better employed in the construction and repair of merchant ships and escorts needed to keep open Britain's lines of communication in the face of the U-boat blockade. Design work continued however, although Hood was too far advanced to incorporate these changes, and ultimately would have been extensive enough for the other three ships to constitute their own class. At the end of 1917 the suspended ships' design was modified to increase the thickness of the turret roofs to six inches (152 mm), and (unspecified) alterations were made to the armoured bulkheads. Other changes were a redesigned bridge structure and moving the funnels closer together and the exchange in position between the fifteen-inch shellrooms and magazines. This latter change would have caused the hull's form to be filled out somewhat to accommodate the handling room of the rearmost turret at the cost of a slight loss in speed and ammunition storage.

Hood was the closest to completion and her construction was continued in case the Germans managed to complete any of their new battlecruisers. Admiral Beatty continually pressed to have Hoods construction expedited and for her sisters to be restarted, but the War Cabinet refused to approve either measure as nothing could be sacrificed in the shipbuilding programme to this end. After the end of the war the three suspended ships were cancelled as they could not fully incorporate the lessons of the war.

General characteristics
This was  longer and  wider than the smaller ships.

Propulsion
The ships had four Brown-Curtis single-reduction geared steam turbine sets, each of which drove one propeller shaft. They were arranged in three engine rooms. The forward engine room held the two turbines for the wing shafts, the middle compartment housed the turbines for the port inner shaft and the aft engine room contained the turbines for the starboard inner shaft. A cruising turbine was built into the casing of each wing turbine. The turbines were powered by twenty-four Yarrow small-tube boilers equally divided between four boiler rooms.

They had eight  dynamos, two diesel, two turbo-driven, and four reciprocating.

Armament

The Admiral-class ships mounted eight BL 15-inch Mk I guns in four twin hydraulically powered Mark II turrets, designated 'A', 'B', 'X' and 'Y' from front to rear. The guns could be depressed to −3° and elevated to 30°; they could be loaded at any angle up to 20°, although loading at high angles tended to slow the gun's return to battery. The ships carried 120 shells per gun.

Their secondary armament consisted of sixteen BL 5.5-inch Mk I guns, which were mounted on pivot mounts on the forecastle deck, protected by gun shields. They were provided with 200 rounds per gun. The guns on their CPII mounts had a maximum elevation of 30°. Their rate of fire was twelve rounds per minute.

The Admiral-class ships were designed with four QF four-inch Mark V anti-aircraft guns. They had a maximum depression of -5° and a maximum elevation of 80°.

Two  submerged side-loading torpedo tubes were fitted forward of 'A' turret and eight above-water side-loading Mark V tubes were intended to be mounted abreast the rear funnel on the upper deck, although only four of the latter were carried by Hood. They were loaded and traversed by hydraulic power; the submerged tubes were fired by compressed air while the above-water tubes used cordite charges. Thirty-two warheads could be accommodated in the two magazines in the hold forward of 'A' turret's shellroom.

Fire-control
The main guns of the Admiral-class ships were controlled from either of the two fire-control directors. The primary director was mounted above the conning tower in an armoured hood and the other was in the fore-top on the foremast. 'B' turret could also control all the main gun turrets while 'X' turret could control the rear guns. Data from a  rangefinder in the armoured hood were input into a Mk V Dreyer Fire Control Table located in the Transmitting Station (TS) on the platform deck where they were converted into range and deflection data for use by the guns. The target's data were also graphically recorded on a plotting table to assist the gunnery officer in predicting the movement of the target. The fore-top was equipped with a  rangefinder. Each turret was provided with a thirty-foot rangefinder in an armoured housing on the turret roof and a Dumaresq analogue computer for local fire-control.

The secondary armament was primarily controlled by the 5.5-inch directors mounted on each side of the bridge. They were supplemented by the two additional control positions in the fore-top, which were provided with  rangefinders. Each of these positions was equipped with a Dumaresq calculator for local control, but the spotting data were normally sent to the 5.5-inch TS on the lower deck much like the procedure for the fifteen-inch guns, except that the firing data were calculated by two Type F fire-control clocks (analog computers). The anti-aircraft guns were controlled by a simple  rangefinder mounted on the aft superstructure.

The torpedoes initially had a similar system where various rangefinders, especially the fifteen-foot rangefinder above the aft torpedo control tower, and deflection sights provided data to a Dreyer table in the torpedo TS adjacent to the 5.5-inch TS on the lower deck. However the Dreyer table was removed during Hoods 1929–1931 refit and the calculations were made in the torpedo control position in the bridge.

Armour
This angle also increased the armor's relative thickness to horizontal, close-range fire, albeit at the cost of reducing its relative height which increased the chance of plunging shellfire going over or under it. This sloped belt made their armor comparable to the  found in the latest British dreadnoughts. Aft of the midships section the belt reduced to six inches (152 mm) ; it did not reach the stern, but terminated at a five-inch bulkhead. The middle belt stretched between 'A' and 'Y' barbettes, ending in four-inch transverse bulkheads at each end. The upper belt only ran from 'A' barbette to the end of the machinery spaces and ended in another four-inch transverse bulkhead. Immediately adjacent to 'A' and 'Y' barbettes the main deck was five inches thick to protect the magazines.

The barbettes had a maximum of twelve inches of armour, but were reduced in thickness in stages below decks, although the outer faces of 'A' and 'Y' barbettes were considerably thicker below decks than the other barbettes. The primary fire-control director atop the conning tower was protected by an armoured hood. The face of the hood was six inches thick, its sides were two inches thick, and its roof was protected by three inches of armour. A communications tube with six-inch sides ran from the conning tower down to the lower conning position on the main deck.

The anti-torpedo bulges of the Admiral-class battlecruisers were the first fitted on a British capital ship to fully incorporate the lessons learned from a series of experiments begun before World War I. They consisted of an outer air space, an inner buoyancy space and the 1.5-inch protective bulkhead. The buoyancy space was filled with sealed steel crushing tubes intended to distribute the force of an explosion over as wide an area as possible as well as absorb as much of its force as possible. However, tests conducted after Hood was completed showed that filling the buoyancy space with water was equally effective and considerably cheaper.

Ships

Service history

Shortly after commissioning on 15 May 1920 Hood became flagship of the Battlecruiser Squadron of the Atlantic Fleet, under the command of Rear Admiral Sir Roger Keyes. She made a cruise to Scandinavian waters that year. She visited the Mediterranean in 1921 and 1922 to show the flag and to train with the Mediterranean Fleet, before sailing on a cruise to Brazil and the West Indies in company with the Battlecruiser Squadron.

In November 1923 Hood, accompanied by the battlecruiser  and a number of s of the 1st Light Cruiser Squadron, set out on a world cruise from west to east via the Panama Canal. They returned home ten months later in September 1924. The Battlecruiser Squadron visited Lisbon in January 1925 to participate in the Vasco da Gama celebrations before continuing on the Mediterranean for exercises. Hood would continue this pattern of a winter training visit to the Mediterranean for the rest of the decade.

Hood was given a major refit from 1 May 1929 to 10 March 1931 and afterwards resumed her role as flagship of the Battlecruiser Squadron. Later that year her crew participated in the Invergordon Mutiny over pay cuts for the sailors. It ended peacefully and Hood returned to her home port afterwards. The Battlecruiser Squadron made a Caribbean cruise in early 1932. The next year she resumed her previous practice of a winter cruise in the Mediterranean. While en route to Gibraltar for one of these cruises she collided with the battlecruiser  on 23 January 1935, but was only lightly damaged. Hood participated in King George V's Silver Jublilee Fleet Review at Spithead the following August. She was transferred to the Mediterranean Fleet shortly afterward and stationed at Gibraltar at the outbreak of the Second Italo-Abyssinian War and the Spanish Civil War. On 23 April 1937 she escorted three British merchantmen into Bilbao harbour despite the presence of the Nationalist cruiser  that attempted to blockade the port. She returned to Portsmouth in January 1939 for an overhaul that lasted until 12 August.

World War II
In June 1939, Hood was assigned to the Home Fleet's Battlecruiser Squadron while still refitting; when war broke out later that year, she was employed principally in patrolling the vicinity of Iceland and the Faroe Islands to protect convoys and intercept German raiders attempting to break out into the Atlantic. In September 1939, she was hit by a 250 kg (550 lb) aircraft bomb with minor damage.

Hood and the aircraft carrier  were ordered to Gibraltar to join Force H on 18 June where Hood would become the flagship. As such, she took part in the destruction of the French Fleet at Mers-el-Kebir in July 1940. Just eight days after the French surrender, the British Admiralty had issued an ultimatum to the French Fleet at Oran to ensure they would not fall into German or Italian hands. The terms were rejected and the Royal Navy opened fire on the French ships berthed there. Hood was straddled during the engagement by Dunkerque; shell splinters wounded two men. Dunkerques sister ship  managed to escape from the harbour and Hood with several light cruisers gave chase, but gave up after two hours after Hood had dodged a salvo of torpedoes from a French sloop and she had stripped a turbine reaching .

Hood was relieved as flagship of Force H by Renown on 10 August after returning to Scapa Flow. After a short refit she resumed her previous role in patrolling against German commerce raiders and convoy escort. This lasted until January 1941 when she began a refit that lasted until March. Unsuccessful, she was ordered to patrol the Bay of Biscay against any breakout attempt by the German ships from Brest. Hood was ordered to the Norwegian Sea on 19 April when the Admiralty received a false report that  had sailed from Germany. Afterwards she patrolled the North Atlantic before putting into Scapa Flow on 6 May.

Battle of the Denmark Strait

On the evening of 21 May 1941 Hood and the newly completed battleship  sailed from Scapa Flow to join the heavy cruisers  and  patrolling the Denmark Strait between Greenland and Iceland on the news that Bismarck and the heavy cruiser  had sortied into the North Atlantic. They had not yet reached the Strait when Suffolk spotted the German ships north of Iceland in the early evening on 23 May. Hood and Prince of Wales altered course and increased their speed to intercept. The British squadron spotted the Germans at 05:37 but the Germans were already aware of their presence. The British opened fire at 05:52 with Hood engaging Prinz Eugen, the lead ship in the German formation, and the Germans returned fire 05:55, both ships concentrating on Hood. Prinz Eugen (probably) was the first ship to score when a shell hit Hoods boat deck, between her funnels, and started a large fire among the ready-use ammunition for the anti-aircraft guns and rockets of the Unrotated Projectile mounts. Right before 06:00, while Hood was turning 20° to port to unmask her rear turrets, she was hit again on the boat deck by a shell from Bismarcks fifth salvo. The exact location and sequence of events is unknown, but her aft fifteen-inch magazines exploded. This broke her back and she sank with the loss of all but three of her crew.

Notes

Footnotes

References

External links
 HMS Hood website

 Admiral class battlecruiser
Battlecruiser classes
Ship classes of the Royal Navy
 Admiral class battlecruiser